(locally: Auna) is the administrative centre of Oppdal Municipality in Trøndelag county, Norway. The village is located at the junction of the European route E06 and the Norwegian National Road 70. The villages of Vognillan, Fagerhaug, and Holan are all located around Oppdal to the west, north, and south respectively.

The village of Oppdal is the site of the municipal government services as well as a school, mall, hotel, stores and businesses as well as the historic Oppdal Church.  The Dovrebanen railway line passes through the village, stopping at the Oppdal Station.

Name
The village (originally the parish) is named after the old Oppdal farm, since that is where the Oppdal Church was located.  The Old Norse form of the name was Uppdalr.  The first element is upp which means "upper" and the last element is dalr which means "valley" or "dale".  Historically, the name was also spelled Opdal.

Notable people

Media gallery

References

External links

Villages in Trøndelag
Oppdal